Cyligramma joa is a moth of the family Noctuidae. This moth species is commonly found in Madagascar.

References

Catocalinae
Moths of Madagascar
Owlet moths of Africa